Southwest Louisiana (SWLA) is a five-parish area intersecting the Acadiana and Central Louisiana regions in the U.S. state of Louisiana. It is composed of the following parishes (counties): Allen, Beauregard, Calcasieu, Cameron, Jefferson Davis. As of 2020, the combined population of the five parish area was 313,951.

Southwest Louisiana has one metropolitan area: Lake Charles. The southwestern portion of Louisiana is also geographically and culturally attached to Southeast Texas.

See also
Intrastate regions

References

External links

Clickable map of Louisiana regions at the Louisiana Board of Regents, a state agency created by the 1974 Louisiana Constitution
Southwest Louisiana Convention & Visitors Bureau

Lake Charles, Louisiana
Acadiana
Regions of Louisiana
Geography of Allen Parish, Louisiana
Geography of Beauregard Parish, Louisiana
Geography of Calcasieu Parish, Louisiana
Geography of Cameron Parish, Louisiana
Geography of Jefferson Davis Parish, Louisiana